was a Japanese politician.

Life 
Born in Imari, and a graduate of Fukuoka Middle School (present-day Fukuoka Prefectural Fukuoka High School), he studied law first at Meiji University and then at Senshu University, graduating in 1944.

After honing his skills as a politician in the Saga Prefectural Assembly (where he eventually became speaker), he was elected to the House of Representatives in 1969 on a ticket from the Liberal Democratic Party. After that, he won reelection ten times in a row. In Yasuhiro Nakasone's second cabinet, he was named Transport minister. In Nakasone's third cabinet he was to lead the Management and Coordination Agency.

In Toshiki Kaifu's first cabinet he was named Chief Cabinet Secretary, but had to resign after only 16 days due to a sex scandal.

In Kiichi Miyazawa's cabinet he was Minister of Health, Labour, and Welfare.

Between 1988 and 2003 he was chairperson of the board of trustees of his alma mater, Senshu University.

He retired from national politics in 2000, but remained an adviser for the Saga branch of the LDP.

He died in Imari on 1 January 2014.

References 

|-

|-

|-

|-

|-

|-

Government ministers of Japan
Grand Cordons of the Order of the Rising Sun
Senshu University alumni
People from Saga Prefecture
1919 births
2014 deaths
Members of the House of Representatives (Japan)
Liberal Democratic Party (Japan) politicians
People from Imari, Saga